The Hakka Affairs Council (HAC; , Pha̍k-fa-sṳ: Hak-kâ Vî-yèn-fi) is a cabinet-level unit under the Executive Yuan of the government of Taiwan. Its mission is to revitalize Hakka language and culture, and promoting Hakka cultural research and exchange.

History

The Hakka Affairs Council, officially established January 1, 2012, is a new agency resulting from the Executive Yuan’s structural reorganization. Its predecessor was the Council for Hakka Affairs, Executive Yuan, founded on June 14, 2001. The Council is the only central authority responsible for Hakka affairs in the world, and its mission is to revitalize Hakka language and culture, build a unifying Hakka identity promoting happiness, confidence and dignity, and become a global center for Hakka cultural research and exchange.

In order to catalyze the Hakka language revival and development, the Council re-structured two departments on January 18, 2021. The Department of Culture and Education is transformed into the Department of Language Development, undertaking the task of building Hakka language infrastructure and strengthening the ethnic language promotion. The Department of Communication and Marketing is re-organized as the Department of Art, Culture and Communication, dedicating to the development and marketing of Hakka cultural content industries.

Responsibilities
To promote ethnic mainstreaming and construct Hakka culture that can be shared by the public through cross-sector collaboration:

1.To formulate Hakka policies and lay the foundation for the rule of law.

2.To develop a Hakka language system and build a Hakka-friendly environment for local communities.

3.To foster innovation of Hakka arts and share diverse cultures.

4.To revitalize Hakka industries and rebuild community-based economy.

5.To strengthen Hakka communication and enhance Hakka prestige.

6.To cultivate Hakka citizens and enable them to connect global Hakka communities.

7.To enrich Hakka cultural resources and find more opportunities for international exchanges.

Organizational structures
 The Department of Planning: 1.    Comprehensive planning and coordination of Hakka affairs policies.  2.    Collection, research, and analysis of basic Hakka information.  3.    Planning, promotion, grants, and supervision of the development of the Hakka knowledge system.  4.    Review, coordination, supervision, control, and assessment of council policy strategy, medium-term and annual national construction plans, preliminary work, and medium- and long-term case projects.  5.    Tracking, control, and assessment of the council’s business reports, policy reports, important measures, meetings, organizational adjustments, and other important matters assigned to them.  6.    Planning, promotion, and security management of council IT services.  7.    Planning, promotion, and handling of local Hakka affairs, National Hakka Conference, and National Hakka Affairs Leadership Conference.  8.    Guidance, liaison, and subsidies for the development of Hakka associations.  9.    Planning, coordination, and promotion of overseas Hakka affairs and art & cultural exchanges.  10.   Other matters related to Hakka development.
The Department of Language:  1.    Research and development of Hakka language policies and laws.  2.    Planning, coordination, promotion, and incentives of Hakka education.  3.    Cultivating Hakka language talents.  4.    Planning and promotion of Hakka-language proficiency certification.  5.    The planning, promotion, and incentives of Hakka as a common language and a language used in government agencies.  6.    Planning, promotion, and incentives of Hakka language used in Taiwanese society.  7.    Planning, promotion, and incentives of constructing the Hakka language foundation and popularizing the use of the language, and its development of digital applications.  8.    Other matters related to Hakka linguistic development.
The Department of Industrial Economy:  1.    Planning, coordination, and promotion of Hakka cultural industry development.  2.    Collection, research, and analysis of Hakka cultural industry development.  3.    Planning and promotion of Hakka cultural industry marketing.  4.    Guidance on the operation and management of Hakka cultural industries.  5.    Cultivating Hakka cultural industry talents.  6.    Subsidies and incentives for Hakka cultural industries.  7.    Planning, coordination, and guidance for Hakka recreational industries.  8.    Building the Hakka living environment and preserving, developing, and reusing traditional spaces.  9.    Revitalizing, operating, and providing guidance for Hakka premises.  10.   Other matters related to Hakka cultural industries and economics.
The Department of Art, Culture and Communication:  1.    Planning, coordinating, promoting, and providing guidance for Hakka art and culture development.  2.    Planning, coordinating, promoting, and providing guidance for the development of the Hakka communication and cultural content industries.  3.    The planning, promotion, and integrated marketing relating to Hakka language and cultural prestige.  4.    Collating and processing of media public relations, press releases, parliamentary liaison, and public opinion.  5.    Supervising and providing guidance for the Hakka Public Communication Foundation.  6.    Other matters related to Hakka art, culture, and communications.
The Secretariat:  1.    Managing official seals, documents, and archives.  2.    Managing payments, finances, maintenance, procurement, and other affairs.  3.    Managing workers (including technicians and drivers).  4.    Other matters that do not fall under the scope of another office.
The Personnel Office: responsible for council personnel matters.
The Civil Service Ethics Office: responsible for council ethics matters.
The Accounting and Statistics Office: responsible for annual accounting, bookkeeping, and statistics.
Legal affairs committee(permanent): handling legal affairs.
Hakka 369 Project Office (temporary): to build a cultural environment in Hakka settlements, focuses on the spatial planning and development in key areas of Hakka culture to improve the environment, and operates community economy for Hakka industrial development.

List of ministers

Political Party:

See also
 Executive Yuan
 Taiwanese Hakka
 Hakka dialects in Taiwan

References

Hakka Affairs Council: Home Page
客家委員會Hakka Affairs Council - YouTube
Hakka Culture Development Center-客家文化發展中心
Japanese Artist’s Sketches of Hakka Impressions Hit Bookstores in Taiwan, Japan-Taiwan News
Taiwan to host 1st World Hakka Expo next year-Taiwan News
National Hakka project marks new milestone in Taiwan’s multiethnic society
The Hakka Language Restoration Movement

2001 establishments in Taiwan
Executive Yuan
Government agencies established in 2001
Hakka culture in Taiwan